The Best of Me is a concert television special by Filipina singer Regine Velasquez. It originally aired on April 27, 2008, in the Philippines on GMA Network. A celebration of Velasquez's 38th birthday, the program consisted of solo performances and select duets. Filmed at Velasquez's Ayala Hillside Estates residence in Quezon City, the two-hour special was directed by Louie Ignacio, while Raul Mitra served as the music director. The program featured guest stars Ogie Alcasid, Jay R, and Kyla, and a special performance with the singer's parents.

The stage was set up on the infinity pool, with musicians, background vocalists and a string section. Velasquez performed a selection of cover songs from rock bands, such as the Eagles and U2, as well as music from Colbie Caillat, David Foster, Josh Groban, and Kenny Loggins. In it, she also premiered the soundtrack of the animated film Urduja (2008), for which she voiced the eponymous title character.

Background
In April 2008, a two-hour television special entitled The Best of Me was conceived to celebrate Regine Velasquez's 38th birthday. The singer stated that when the idea of a birthday special was presented to her, she wanted the show to be a complete 180 from her usual repertoire. Also, she did not want it to be the typical concert showcase. The special was described in a press release as "a totally different facet of Asia's Songbird", which would feature songs the singer has been "itching to perform onstage but never really got a chance because it is not what the audience expects". It was confirmed that she will perform an Italian song titled "Per te" and the Academy Award-winning indie folk song "Falling Slowly". A promotional tie-in with the special was the premiere performance of the movie theme "Babae", from the animated film Urduja (2008), for which the eponymous title character was voiced by Velasquez.

Principal photography took place at Velasquez's Ayala Hillside Estates residence in Quezon City, which was completed in November 2007. During an interview with the Philippine Entertainment Portal, she shared that her production team had challenges finding a concert venue, so she took inspiration from Barbara Streisand's benefit concert special One Voice, which was filmed at Streisand's Malibu home. When asked about the concept and design for the show, Velasquez revealed that she suggested having the stage set up by the infinity pool for the performances. She added that the special was filmed to coincide at twilight.

GMA Network partnered with Velasquez to premiere the program. It was produced by Aria Productions, with Perry Lansigan serving as executive producer. Louie Ignacio directed it, while Darling de Jesus was the supervising producer. Rannel David served as the line producer, and Archie Riola was in charge of floor production. Juel Balbon was co-executive producer and Wilma V. Galvante was in charge of the executive production. Raul Mitra was chosen as the music director. Guest performers included Ogie Alcasid, Jay R, and Kyla. The Best of Me was aired on April 27, 2008, in the Philippines on GMA.

Synopsis
The show began with Velasquez, perched at the balcony of her three storey residence wearing a silk dress and jeans, singing the first few verses of David Foster's "The Best of Me". She then headed down the stairs towards the plexiglass stage set up on the infinity pool. At the stage, she begins performing Kenny Loggins's "Conviction of the Heart", accompanied by musicians, background vocalists. and a string section. She followed this with a rendition of Colbie Caillat's "Bubbly", before transitioning to a medley of songs popularized by singer-songwriter Clair Marlo.

The next segment saw Velasquez changing outfits into a red gown, and beginning a performance of the Eagles's "Hotel California". She later moved into the edge of the pool to perform Josh Groban's Italian single "Per te". At this point, she briefly spoke about the animated film Urduja (2008) before she began singing its theme "Babae". Jay R and Kyla then joined her for a performance of Loggins's "This Is It". After the number, she sang her 1990 single "Hindi Na, Ayoko Na" and was then joined by her parents for a surprise performance of Al Martino's "You'll Never Know (Just How Much I Love You)".

The third segment started with Velasquez introducing each member of her band and vocalists, and continued with Loggins's "Footloose". Shortly after, Ogie Alcasid made his way to the stage for a duet number of "Falling Slowly". For the final act, Velasquez donned a green dress and began with the Motown hit "Got to Be There". She then goes straight into a full performance of the opening song, "The Best of Me", with brief a fireworks display. Velasquez closed the special with a performance of U2's "Pride (In the Name of Love)", as she dove into the pool after the number ended.

Set list
Set list adapted from the special itself.
 "Conviction of the Heart
 "Bubbly"
 "'Til They Take My Heart Away" / "Without Me" / "I Believe (When I Fall in Love It Will Be Forever)" / "Do You Love Me?"
 "Hotel California"
 "Per te"
 "Babae"
 "This Is It" 
 "Hindi Na, Ayoko Na"
 "You'll Never Know (Just How Much I Love You)"
 "Footloose"
 "Falling Slowly" 
 "Got to Be There"
 "The Best of Me"
 "Pride (In the Name of Love)"

Personnel
Credits adapted from the special itself.

Band members

 Regine Velasquezlead vocals
 Raul Mitramusic director
 Romeo Pacanabass guitar
 Cesar Aguasguitar
 Noel Mendezguitar
 Sonny Matiaskeyboard
 Ferdinand Faustinodrums 
 Ulysses Avantepercussion
 Eugen Gallobacking vocals 
 Marrise Abrillabacking vocals 
 Tanya Marquezbacking vocals
 Babsie Molinabacking vocals
 Sylvia Macaraegbacking vocals
 Rene Martinezbacking vocals
 Antonio Bautistastring section
 Regine Imperialstring section
 Antonio Baustisastring section
 Rogelio Santosstring section
 Ruben Bautistastring section
 Sulpicio Garciastring section
 Niño Llorinstring section
 Cecilia Noblestring section
 Marlo Reyesstring section

Production

 Wilma V. Galvanteexecutive in charge of production
 Perry Lansiganexecutive producer
 Juel Balbonco-executive producer
 Darling de Jesussupervising producer
 Edlyn Abuelassociate producer
 Paul Chiaassociate producer
 Cathy Sorianoassociate producer
 Archie Riolafloor producer
 Rannel Davidline producer
 Louie Ignaciotelevision director
 Edward Alegreeditor

See also
 List of GMA Network specials aired
 Regine Velasquez on screen and stage

References

External links
 

Regine Velasquez
2008 television specials
GMA Network television specials